The Daher Kodiak (formerly Quest Kodiak) is an American utility aircraft designed by and originally manufactured by Quest Aircraft. Manufacturing was taken over by Daher in 2019 after its purchase of Quest Aircraft. The high-wing, unpressurized, single-engined turboprop has a fixed tricycle landing gear and is suitable for STOL operations from unimproved airfields.

Design began in 1999, it made its maiden flight on October 16, 2004, and was certified on 31 May 2007 before first delivery in January 2008. By 2021, 300 were delivered.

Development

Engineering design began in 1999, while the company organization was being finalized.
The design was type certified by the US Federal Aviation Administration on 31 May 2007.

In June 2010, Wipaire, Inc. was granted Supplemental Type Certification allowing Wipline 7000 amphibious floats to be installed on Kodiaks. In November of that same year, it was also certified for flight into known icing after the installation of a TKS system, which protects exposed surfaces via glycol-based fluids.

In 2014, an executive "Summit interior" with club seating was introduced.

In April 2017, the Kodiak received its type certificate from the European Aviation Safety Agency.

In May 2018, Quest Aircraft unveiled the Series II, priced at $2.15 million.
The airframe has improved cargo door step mechanism and wing-root sealing, new crew-door stays, optional single-point refueling, and new paint schemes.
The cockpit has compact backup instruments, a faster Garmin G1000 NXi with HSI map displaying traffic, terrain, weather, navaids, and obstacles and an multifunction display showing terrain, usable for weight and balance and permitting autopilot visual approaches.

In 2019, French aircraft manufacturer Daher acquired Quest Aircraft from Setouchi Holdings.
The Series III version was unveiled in March 2021.
In 2021, its equipped price was $2.63M.

Design

The utility aircraft can accommodate 10 people. It features short-field capability and good useful load. Its STOL performance comes from a fixed, discontinuous leading edge on the outboard wing and the  Pratt & Whitney Canada PT6A-34 turboprop engine.

Passenger seats are track-mounted and removable, it has access doors for the pilots and the aft clamshell door, with automatic steps, allows cargo loading or eight passengers boarding.

The Kodiak's aluminum fuselage can be repaired in the field and offers a  cargo door. Optional Aerocet carbon-fiber floats can be fitted and weigh  with wheels or  without wheels, the carbon-fiber floats are  lighter than aluminum floats while cruising  faster and are more watertight. The Aerocet floats can be operated in  waves. The Kodiak Series II is more refined and has upgraded door and wing root seals to reduce wind leaks and exhaust odors. The model's upgraded Garmin G1000NXi avionics are similar to the original G1000 with three  screens, but is more responsive and offers more PFD insets, including a mini moving map, which can display traffic, terrain, waypoints and weather.

The Kodiak is bigger than the DHC-2 Beaver, but smaller than the DHC-3 Otter or Cessna Caravan. It has more power than the older de Havillands and takes off in less distance than the Caravan.

Operational history

The first Kodiak was delivered to launch customer Spirit Air in January 2008. By September 2013, 100 Kodiaks had been built, with the 100th aircraft being delivered to US operator Sunstate Aviation. The Kodiak was designed for use by mission societies, and several aircraft have been delivered to organisations such as Mission Aviation Fellowship and JAARS. Some of the Kodiaks built have been produced under Quest Aircraft's Quest Mission Team (QMT) program. The QMT program aims to sell one of every 11 Kodiaks built to a mission organisation at cost price.

The 200th aircraft was delivered in December 2016 for a record yearly production of 36 Kodiaks, while the production facility was extended by 25% in September to cope with growing demand.
The 250th was delivered in 2018, as the highest time aircraft surpassed 5,000 hours.
The 300th aircraft had been delivered by December 2021, as the fleet had logged over 278,700 flight hours.

Variants
Kodiak 100
Base model, FAA certificated 31 May 2007.
Kodiak 100 Series II
Model introduced in May 2018, incorporating improvements, including a Garmin G1000NXi avionics suite, Flight Stream 510 tablet connection device, an angle-of-attack indicator and a digital standby four instrument group.
Kodiak 100 Series III
Model introduced in March 2021, incorporating a Garmin G1000 NXi instrument panel, a GFC 700 autopilot, SurfaceWatch runway monitoring technology, synthetic vision system and an optional Garmin GWX 75 Doppler-capable weather radar. An eight-seat "Executive Edition" VIP cabin was also introduced. It has club-seating, increased oxygen volume, along with air conditioning with separate controls for the cockpit and cabin.

Kodiak 900
Stretched variant of the Kodiak 100 Series III introduced at the 2022 EAA AirVenture at Oshkosh. The 900 features a 3.9-foot longer fuselage and is powered by a 900-shp Pratt & Whitney Canada PT6A-140A engine. Deliveries are expected to commence around January 2023. The Kodiak 900 will supplement the Kodiak 100 but not replace it.
Air Claw
A surveillance modification by Northrop Grumman with a FLIR Systems Star Safire sensor and a Persistent Surveillance Systems Hawkeye wide area sensor.

Operators

The largest single order was announced on 15 November 2016 for 20 aircraft from Sky Trek, to be delivered within a year.
Tokyo-based Sky Trek plans to begin air charter services in the first half of 2017 and is a start-up membership-based operator owned by Mitsui and Setouchi Holdings. Setouchi was the Quest dealer for Japan and purchased Quest Aircraft in 2015.

In November 2017, 220 Quest Kodiaks are flying worldwide as freighters, for skydiving and as business aircraft.

India's SpiceJet intends to buy 100 amphibious Kodiaks, a $400 million deal. It has applied for financial support from Narendra Modi as part of the national aviation expansion program UDAN (Ude Desh Ka Aam Naagrik, "Let Every Person Fly") for connecting its population by air, despite limited infrastructure. As only 3% of Indians travel by air, it is hoped that the Kodiak will stimulate air travel by operating from  waterways and unimproved runways. The aircraft has been demonstrated as a landplane and seaplane demonstrations will happen next. Aerocet carbon-fiber amphibious floats are a $400,000 option.

Specifications

See also

Notes

References

External links

 
 
 
 
 
 
 

2000s United States civil utility aircraft
Single-engined tractor aircraft
Single-engined turboprop aircraft
High-wing aircraft
Aircraft first flown in 2004